In 1993, Evan Chandler, a dentist and screenwriter based in Los Angeles, accused the American singer Michael Jackson of sexually abusing Chandler's 13-year-old son, Jordan. Jackson had befriended Jordan after renting a vehicle from Jordan's stepfather. Though Evan Chandler initially encouraged the friendship, he later confronted his ex-wife, who had custody of Jordan, with suspicions that the relationship was inappropriate.

Chandler wanted to resolve the issue with a financial settlement, but he and Jackson could not agree on an amount. In July, Jordan told a psychiatrist and police that Jackson had sexually abused him, triggering an investigation. Some of Jackson's staff reported inappropriate behavior, but the police dismissed their accounts as not credible as they had sold their stories to tabloids or had grievances against Jackson. Jackson's legal team maintained that Chandler was attempting to extort Jackson, citing a phone recording in which he said he was going to "humiliate" Jackson and "win big-time".

In August 1993, as the third leg of Jackson's Dangerous World Tour began, news of the allegations broke and received worldwide media attention. Jackson canceled the remainder of the tour, citing health problems arising from the scandal. That September, the Chandlers filed a lawsuit against Jackson. They and Jackson reached a financial settlement in January 1994; Jackson and his legal team stressed that this was not an admission of guilt. The investigation found no physical evidence against Jackson. In September 1994, the investigation was closed after the Chandlers declined to cooperate, leaving the case without its main witness. 

The allegations affected Jackson's public image and commercial standing. Several of his endorsement deals were canceled, including his decade-long Pepsi endorsement. Further allegations of abuse by Jackson led to the People v. Jackson trial in 2005, in which Jackson was found not guilty on all charges. In November 2009, five months after Jackson's death, Evan Chandler died by suicide following several years of depression and estrangement from his family.

Background
According to Consequence of Sound, in 1993, the American pop star Michael Jackson was the most popular musician in the world. That February, Jackson's car broke down and was towed to a local garage, Rent-A-Wreck. The Rent-A-Wreck owner David Schwartz called his wife, June Chandler-Schwartz, to meet Jackson. She brought her son from a previous marriage, Jordan Chandler. Jordan's father, Evan Chandler, was a dentist who treated Hollywood celebrities. He was also a screenwriter who co-wrote the 1993 comedy Robin Hood: Men In Tights.

Jackson and Jordan became close; the National Enquirer ran a featured story titled "Michael's New Adopted Family", implying that Jackson had "stolen" Jordan from Evan. Jackson invited Jordan, his stepsister and his mother to visit his home, Neverland Ranch, on the weekends. They would also take trips to Las Vegas and Florida. These trips interfered with Jordan's scheduled visits with Evan, with Jordan preferring to visit Neverland Ranch.

In May, Evan encouraged Jackson to spend more time with Jordan. Evan suggested that Jackson should build an extension onto Jackson's house; when they were denied planning permission, Chandler suggested Jackson buy him a house. In the same month, Jordan and June flew with Jackson to Monaco for the World Music Awards. According to June's lawyer, Michael Freeman, Evan was jealous and felt left out. Upon their return, Jackson stayed in the Schwartz-Chandler home for five days; Jackson slept in a room with Jordan and his stepbrother. Chandler said this is when he became suspicious of sexual misconduct by Jackson, although he said that Jackson and Jordan were clothed when he saw them in bed together, and never claimed to have witnessed sexual misconduct. Jordan and Jackson's contact ended in June 1993.

Allegations 
On July 8, 1993, Schwartz phoned Evan to discuss Jordan’s relationship with Jackson. Unbeknownst to Evan, Schwartz recorded the phone call. Chandler was hostile about Jackson, describing him as "evil". He said he had hired "the nastiest son of a bitch he could find", the lawyer Barry Rothman, to humiliate Jackson, and said:

When Schwartz asked how this would affect Jordan, Chandler replied:

In August, Chandler extracted one of Jordan's teeth. While Jordan was under the effects of the sedative, Evan asked him if Jackson had ever touched his penis; Jordan said yes.

Chandler and his legal team approached Jackson asking for $20 million, threatening to take the dispute to a criminal court. Jackson refused, saying, "No way in hell." A few weeks later, Jackson's legal team made a counter-offer of $1 million; this was declined by Chandler, who then requested $15 million. Jackson refused and lowered his offer to $350,000, which Chandler also refused. According to some sources, Evan unsuccessfully sought a $20-million film production deal with Jackson to avoid going to court. In October 1994, Mary A. Fischer of GQ reported it was Chandler who initially accused Jackson of molesting his son, before he demanded a screenwriting deal from Jackson instead of going to the police. 

On July 15, the child psychiatrist Mathis Abrams wrote to Rothman, who was seeking an expert opinion to help establish the allegations against Jackson. Abrams wrote that there was "reasonable suspicion" of sexual abuse without having met Evan or Jordan. He also said that, if this were not a hypothetical case, he would be required by law to report the matter to the Los Angeles County Department of Children’s Services. On August 17, Evan took Jordan to Abrams and told him Jordan had been molested. Over a three-hour session, Jordan told Abrams that Jackson had sexually abused him for months and gave graphic accounts of masturbation and oral sex. Jordan repeated these allegations to police and described Jackson's penis. According to the county's DCFS reports, Jordan had difficulty remembering the times and dates of his alleged molestation, but was consistent in his story.

Investigation 

On August 18, 1993, the Los Angeles Police Department's Sexually Exploited Child Unit began a criminal investigation into Jackson. June Chandler initially told police that she did not believe Jackson had molested her son; however, her position wavered a few days later. On August 21, a search warrant was issued, allowing police to search Neverland Ranch. Police questioned 30 children who were friends of Jackson; all stated that he was not a child molester. Gary Hearne, Jackson's chauffeur, testified in his deposition to driving Jackson to Jordan's house at night and collecting him in the morning for a period of about thirty days.

On August 24, the day the allegations were made public, Jackson began the third leg of his Dangerous World Tour in Bangkok. That day, Anthony Pellicano, a private detective hired by Jackson, held a press conference accusing Chandler of trying to extort $20 million from Jackson. He did not mention that Jackson had made several counter-offers. The Jackson family also held a press conference, saying it was their "unequivocal belief" that Michael was a victim of extortion. On August 26, Jackson's promoters released an audiotape of him apologizing to his fans for cancelling his second show in two days.

On August 31, attorney Gloria Allred held a press conference stating she had been retained on behalf of the Chandlers, and implied a civil suit against Jackson would be made. On September 10, Allred said that she was off the case, declining further comment as to why. On September 13, the Chandlers hired Larry R. Feldman, former Los Angeles County Bar Association president.

On October 6, 1993, Jordan Chandler underwent a psychiatric interview with Dr. Richard Gardner in New York. Dr. Gardner had formulated Parental Alienation Syndrome (PAS) in 1985, a disorder that arises primarily in the context of child-custody disputes. Jordan gave his account of what allegedly happened between him and Jackson in May 1993, during their trip to Monaco for the World Music Awards. On November 8, police searched the Jackson family home, Hayvenhurst.

The Schwartzes gave the tape of Chandler's July conversation with Schwartz to the authorities, who leaked it to the press. The recorded conversation was a critical aspect of Jackson's defense against the allegations made against him. Jackson and his supporters argued that he was the victim of a jealous father whose only goal was to extort Jackson. The tape was publicly released by Pellicano, after edits had been made.

Testimony from staff and other children 
Brett Barnes, aged 11, publicly said he had shared a bed with Jackson, but insisted there was no sexual abuse: "I was on one side of the bed and he was on the other. It was a big bed." Wade Robson, aged 10, told Fox Television that he too shared a bed with Jackson but that nothing sexual had happened. Several parents complained of aggressive investigative techniques by police; they claimed the police frightened their children with lies such as "we have nude photos of you", and told parents their children had been molested even though their children had denied it.

In September 1993, police officers traveled to the Philippines to interview two of Jackson's ex-housekeepers. However, the ex-employees lacked credibility due to a back salary argument they had with Jackson. A former security guard made various allegations about Jackson, saying he was fired because he "knew too much", and alleged that he was ordered by Jackson to destroy a photo of a naked boy. Instead of reporting this alleged event to the police, he sold the story to Hard Copy for $150,000. On December 13, 1993, Jackson's maid, Blanca Francia, alleged that she "quit in disgust" after seeing Jackson in a shower with a child, but did not inform the police. Lisa D. Campbell reported that Francia had been fired in 1991 and had sold her story to Hard Copy for $20,000. However, when Diane Dimond interviewed Francia on the show, she denied being fired but acknowledged being compensated by Hard Copy.

On December 2, 1993, attorney Charles Mathews held a press conference about his clients allegedly being threatened and harassed by Anthony Pellicano's machinations. Mathews was representing Jackson's former security guards in a wrongful termination lawsuit filed on November 22. The lawsuit alleged wrongful termination due to "firsthand personal knowledge of many of [Michael Jackson's] nighttime visits with young boys".

Investigation into Chandler 
The police also began an investigation into Evan Chandler for extortion, finding that he was $68,400 behind in his child support payments despite being well-paid as a dentist. Following a five-month investigation, deputy Los Angeles County District Attorney Michael Montagna released a public statement stating no charges had been brought against Chandler, citing Jackson's lawyers' failure to file for extortion in a timely manner and Jackson's willingness to negotiate with Chandler for several weeks. Montagna explained that settlements were encouraged as they were favored by the law. Montagna also said the discussions between Jackson's representatives and Barry K. Rothman, Chandler's attorney at that time, appeared to have been attempts to settle a possible civil case, not efforts to extort money.

Use of sedatives 
Chandler admitted he had used the sedative sodium amytal during Jordan's dental surgery, during which Jordan said Jackson had touched his penis. Sodium amytal is a barbiturate that puts people in a hypnotic state when injected intravenously. Studies carried out in 1952 demonstrated that it enabled false memories to be implanted. According to Alison Winter, a science historian at the University of Chicago, these types of drug place people in a state of "extreme suggestibility ... People will pick up on cues about what questioners want to hear and repeat that back."

Mark Torbiner, the dental anesthesiologist who administered the drug, told GQ that if sodium amytal was used, "it was for dental purposes". According to Diane Dimond of the tabloid TV program Hard Copy, Torbiner's records show that Robinul and Vistaril were administered instead of sodium amytal. The U.S. Drug Enforcement Administration was investigating Torbiner's administration of drugs during house calls, where he mostly gave patients morphine and Demerol. Torbiner's credentials with the Board of Dental Examiners indicated that he was restricted by law to administering drugs solely for dental procedures, but he had not adhered to those restrictions; for example, he had given general anesthetic to Barry Rothman during hair transplant procedures. Torbiner had introduced Chandler and Rothman in 1991, when Rothman needed dental work.

Strip search
On February 10, 1993, Jackson had revealed in a televised interview that he had vitiligo, a skin disorder that destroys skin pigmentation and creates blotches. The interview was watched by 90 million viewers, and after it aired expert information on vitiligo was widely shared in the media. According to Pellicano, Jordan Chandler said in July 1993 that Jackson did lift his shirt once to show the blotches on his skin.

On December 20, 1993, investigators for the Santa Barbara County Sheriff's Department and the LAPD issued Jackson with a warrant for a strip search, as police wanted to verify Jordan's description of Jackson's private anatomy. The officers photographed Jackson's entire body. The police were looking for discoloration, any signs of vitiligo that Jordan had spoken about, or any other skin disorder. Refusal to comply would have been used in court as an indication of guilt.

Those present for the prosecution were District Attorney Tom Sneddon, a detective, a photographer, and a doctor. Those present on behalf of Jackson were his two attorneys, a physician, a detective, a bodyguard, and a photographer. The attorneys and Sneddon agreed to leave the room when the examination took place. At Jackson's insistence, the prosecution detective also left. In an emotional state, Jackson stood on a platform in the middle of the room and disrobed. The search lasted for approximately 25 minutes. He was never touched.

On January 28, 1994, Reuters and USA Today reported that an unidentified source had told that the pictures did not match Jordan's description. According to LAPD detective and pedophilia expert Bill Dworin, who spoke to NBC News in February 2003, Jordan's description matched the photos of Jackson's genitalia. Dworin did not believe that Jordan's accusations were coached. The DA and the sheriff's photographer stated that the description was accurate, but the jurors felt that the photos did not match the description. In March 1994, Jackson's mother Katherine was called to testify in front of the LA County Grand Jury. Investigators asked whether her son had altered the appearance of his genitalia. Jordan claimed that Jackson was circumcised. However, Jackson's autopsy report showed that he had not been circumcised and his foreskin appeared intact, with no signs of surgical restoration.

On January 4, 1994, Larry Feldman filed a court motion in an effort to obtain the police photographs of Jackson. The motion stated a "multiple choice" request: either provide copies of the photographs, submit Jackson to a second search, or the court can bar the photographs from the civil trial as evidence. Feldman said that the district attorney's office previously refused the request of these photographs. Jackson's lawyers asked a Santa Barbara County judge to order prosecutors to return the nude photographs, fearing they would become public, but were denied.

Allegations by La Toya Jackson 
On September 2, 1993, as a guest on the Today show, Jackson's sister La Toya Jackson expressed support for her brother, stating: "I stand by [Michael] one thousand percent… If you think about it, he has been convicted before a trial." In the same interview, she said she could not tell if the allegations were true and that, not being a judge, could not assess this. A few weeks later, on the Maury show, La Toya said Jackson was being convicted by the public without having been charged with any crime. She said there was nothing inappropriate about his relationship with children and that she would never believe such allegations.

However, on December 8, 1993, La Toya, who had been estranged from the Jackson family and not seen her brother for several years, said Jackson was a pedophile. She said she had seen checks made out to different boys' families and that Jackson's own childhood physical abuse had turned him into an abuser. She and her then-husband Jack Gordon also said that Jackson had tried to kidnap and kill her. On December 9, La Toya repeated her suspicions to Katie Couric on Today: "I do know he'd have boys over all the time and they'd stay in his room for days. Then they would come out ... There'd be another boy and he'd bring someone else but never two at a time."

La Toya said she had proof of Jackson's pedophilia and offered to disclose it for $500,000. A bidding war between US and UK tabloids began, but fell through when, as Jackson's biographer J. Randy Taraborrelli wrote, "She didn't have much to offer, after all." The Jackson family disowned her, and in later years she recanted the allegations, saying she had been forced to make them by her husband. Prior to making the allegations, Gordon had been arrested for assaulting her, and the couple divorced three years later. By the turn of the millennium, Jackson had forgiven his sister. In 2009, when recanting her 1993 statements to the broadcaster Barbara Walters, she said that Jackson had not been a pedophile and had never indulged in improper relations with a child.

Lisa Marie Presley 
According to Chris Cadman, Jackson met the singer Lisa Marie Presley around May 26, 1974, during a Jackson 5 engagement in Lake Tahoe. Her father, Elvis Presley, was closing a two-week engagement at the Sahara Tahoe while the Jackson 5 were just about to begin one. In November 1992, Jackson was reconnected with Presley through a mutual friend, and they talked almost every day by telephone. As the abuse accusations became public, he became dependent on Presley for emotional support; she was concerned about his faltering health. She stated, "I believed he didn't do anything wrong and that he was wrongly accused and yes I started falling for him. I wanted to save him. I felt that I could do it." She described him in one call as high, incoherent and delusional. He proposed to her over the phone in late 1993, saying, "If I asked you to marry me, would you do it?" They divorced less than two years later.

Jackson's health 
Jackson took painkillers for his scalp surgeries, administered due to the Pepsi commercial accident in 1984, and became dependent on them to deal with the stress of the allegations. Within a few months of the allegations becoming news, he had lost approximately 10 pounds and stopped eating. According to Jackson, he had a tendency to stop eating when "really upset or hurt" and his friend Elizabeth Taylor had to make him eat: "She took the spoon and would put it into my mouth." He said that he eventually became unconscious and had to be fed intravenously.

While in Mexico on November 8, 1993, in a court deposition unrelated to the alleged child abuse, Jackson appeared drowsy, lacked concentration, and slurred while speaking. He said he could not remember the dates of his album releases or the names of people he had worked with, and took several minutes to name some of his recent albums. On November 12, Jackson canceled the remainder of his tour and flew with Taylor and her husband to London. When Jackson arrived at the airport, he had to be held up. He was rushed to the home of Elton John's manager and afterward to a clinic. When he was searched for drugs on entry, 18 vials of medicine were found in a suitcase. Jackson booked the whole fourth floor of the clinic and was put on a Valium IV to wean him from painkillers. While in the clinic, he took part in group and one-on-one therapy sessions.

On November 15, Jackson's lawyer, Bert Fields, spoke publicly of their last meeting in Mexico City and Jackson's painkiller addiction: "[Michael's] life was in danger if he continued taking these massive quantities of drugs. He was barely able to function adequately on an intellectual level." Fields insisted that a U.S. drug rehabilitation center would not have the privacy Jackson wanted. He also stated that his client was not trying to evade investigation: "If Michael Jackson wanted an excuse to stay out of the United States, all he had to do is stay on his tour." On November 23, Fields resigned from the case.

Jackson's response
On December 22, 1993, Jackson responded to the accusations for the first time via satellite from Neverland Ranch. He denied all the allegations and stated his intent to prove his innocence. He accused the media of manipulating the allegations to "reach their own conclusions", and described the "dehumanizing" police search as "the most humiliating ordeal of my life". On January 5, 1994, a few weeks before the settlement, Jackson gave a five-minute speech at the 26th NAACP Image Awards asserting his innocence and received a standing ovation. During the ceremony, one presenter had included Jackson in a list of names, calling him "Michael (Innocent Until Proven Guilty) Jackson".

Media reaction
Most of the information available on the allegations was released (officially or unofficially) by the prosecution and unchallenged by Jackson. He was largely portrayed as guilty by the media, which used sensational headlines implying guilt when the content itself did not support the headline. Stories were purchased of his alleged criminal activity, police investigation material was leaked, and unflattering photographs of Jackson were printed.

Two weeks after the allegations were reported, the headline "Michael Jackson: A Curtain Closes" reflected the attitude of most tabloid media. The New York Post ran the headline "Peter Pan or pervert". In a piece for Hard Copy, Dimond—a journalist who spent the next fifteen years trying to prove Jackson was a pedophile—ran a story stating it had acquired "new documents in the criminal investigation of Michael Jackson, and they are chilling; they contain the name of child movie actor Macaulay Culkin". In fact, the document stated that Culkin denied being abused by Jackson.

Two tabloid media outlets bought confidential leaked documents from the LAPD for $20,000. A number of Jackson's former employees—most of whom had worked at Neverland—sold stories which alleged prior sexual misconduct on Jackson's part, instead of reporting their claims to police. One couple asked for $100,000, claiming that Jackson had sexually caressed Culkin. For a fee of $500,000, they would also allege that Jackson put his hands down Culkin's pants. Culkin strongly denied the allegation and did so again in court during Jackson's 2005 trial.

When Jackson left the US to go into drug rehabilitation, the Daily Mirror (UK) held a "Spot the Jacko" contest, offering readers a trip to Disney World if they could correctly predict where he would appear next. A Daily Express headline read "Drug treatment star faces life on the run", while a News of the World headline said Jackson was a fugitive. These tabloids also falsely alleged that Jackson had traveled to Europe to have cosmetic surgery that would make him unrecognizable. Geraldo Rivera set up a mock trial, with a jury made up of audience members, even though Jackson had not been charged with a crime. A poll at the time, conducted by A Current Affair, found that nearly 75 percent of Americans believed Jackson was telling the truth.

Lawsuit 
On September 14, 1993, Jordan Chandler and his parents filed a lawsuit against Jackson. The lawsuit claimed that Jackson had committed sexual battery, seduction, willful misconduct, intentional infliction of emotional distress, fraud and negligence. In November, Jackson's lawyers asked the case be put on hold for as long as six years or until the criminal case was concluded. Concerns about a civil trial during an ongoing criminal investigation, and prosecutors' access to plaintiffs' civil trial information, stemmed from Jackson's Fifth Amendment rights. Since two grand juries deemed there was insufficient evidence for criminal charges by the end of the investigation, the prosecution could have been able to form the elements of a case around the defense strategy in the trial, creating a situation akin to double jeopardy.

Superior Court Judge David M. Rothman ordered Jackson's deposition scheduled before the end of January 1994 but said he might reconsider if Jackson was indicted on criminal charges. Jackson agreed to be deposed on January 18. His attorneys said he was eager to testify, but also said they might oppose the deposition if criminal charges were filed or were still under consideration on his deposition date. They said if charges were filed, they would want the criminal trial to go first. However, when authorities notified Jackson's lawyers that they expected their investigation to continue at least through February, Jackson's team failed to win a delay of the civil case. Rothman denied the motion to delay the civil proceedings until the criminal investigation had been completed, and set March 21, 1994, as the trial start date.

Pellicano said Chandler's negotiations had been an attempt to extort Jackson. To try to demonstrate this, he produced illicit recordings of his negotiations with Rothman. Illicit recordings are generally not admissible as evidence, but may be used in California where extortion is threatened. Howard Weitzman turned over the tapes to the district attorney's office.

On December 17, 1993, Rothman allowed the prosecutors to receive information from Jackson's lawyers and approved discovery information for media disclosure. Both Feldman's and Jackson's camps expressed concerns about Jackson's right to a fair trial being compromised by publicly discussing discovery results. Johnnie Cochran and Howard Weitzman, attorneys representing Jackson, argued that investigators were trying to use the suit to advance their criminal investigation, a technique that should not be allowed.

On January 24, 1994, prosecutors announced that they would not bring charges against Chandler for attempted extortion, as Jackson's camp had been slow to report an extortion claim to the police and had tried to negotiate a settlement for several weeks. Chandler had made his settlement demand in early August 1993, and the Jackson camp had filed extortion charges against the Chandler camp in late August. In the extortion investigation, a search warrant was never sought to search the homes and offices of Chandler and Barry Rothman. No grand jury convened when both men refused police interviews. In contrast, the police had searched Jackson's residences solely based on Jordan's allegations, and taken lengths to interview or intimidate witnesses. Weitzman said they had not gone to the police earlier because "It was our hope that this would all go away. We tried to keep it as much in-house as we could."

Settlement 
Jackson's legal team met three times a week at Taylor's home to discuss the case. Eventually, they agreed that Jackson was too sick to endure a lengthy trial and that he should settle out of court. The lawsuit was settled on January 25, 1994, with $15,331,250 to be held in a trust fund for Jordan, $1.5 million for each of his parents, and $5 million for the family's lawyer, for a total of approximately $23 million. According to a motion passed to Judge Melville in 2004, "the settlement was for global claims of negligence and the lawsuit was defended by Mr. Jackson's insurance carrier. The [carrier] negotiated and paid the settlement, over the protests of Mr. Jackson and his personal legal counsel."

On January 29, 1994, the Associated Press reported that Jackson had requested his insurance company, Transamerica Insurance Group (TIG), contribute to the settlement. A lawyer for TIG, Jordan Harriman, had made a "one-time-only" offer to Jackson on January 13 to resolve his claim. Jackson refused that offer but further negotiations followed. Russ Wardrip, a TIG claims analyst, had sent a January 13 registered letter to Jackson's lawyer, Howard Weitzman:

According to Jackson's attorney Thomas Mesereau, Jackson's insurance company was "the source of the settlement amounts", as noted in a 2005 memorandum in People v. Jackson. The memorandum also noted that "an insurance carrier has the right to settle claims covered by insurance where it decides settlement is expedient and the insured may not interfere with nor prevent such settlements", as established by a number of precedents in California. Defeating the right would involve convincing a court with the power to overrule the precedent that the earlier decision was either wrongly decided or more often, "clearly" wrong (depending on the criteria of the court) or the court must be convinced to distinguish the case. That is, to make the ruling narrower than that in the precedent due to some difference in facts between the current and precedent case while supporting the result reached in the earlier case.

In 2004, Mesereau said: "People who intended to earn millions of dollars from [Jackson's] record and music promotions did not want negative publicity from these lawsuits interfering with their profits. Michael Jackson now regrets making these payments. These settlements were entered into with one primary condition – that condition was that Mr. Jackson never admitted any wrongdoing. [He] always denied doing anything wrong ... Mr. Jackson now realizes the advice he received was wrong." Jackson explained why he had settled: "I wanted to go on with my life. Too many people had already been hurt. I want to make records. I want to sing. I want to perform again ... It's my talent. My hard work. My life. My decision." He also wanted to avoid a "media circus". Mesereau later said Jackson regretted settling.

The settlement cannot be used as evidence of guilt in future civil and criminal cases. In 1994, Larry Feldman said "nobody bought anybody's silence" with the civil settlement. Bribery to not testify in a trial is a felony according to California Penal Code 138. Receiving such a bribe is also a felony according to this law.

Closure of investigation
District Attorney Gil Garcetti said that the settlement did not affect criminal prosecution and that the investigation was ongoing. Jordan Chandler was interviewed after the settlement by detectives seeking evidence of child molestation, but no criminal charges were filed. On May 2, 1994, the Santa Barbara County grand jury disbanded without indicting Jackson, while a Los Angeles County grand jury continued to investigate the sexual abuse allegations.

On April 11, 1994, the grand jury session in Santa Barbara was extended by 90 days, allowing DA Sneddon to gather more evidence. Prosecution sources said they were frustrated in their grand jury probe, failing to find direct evidence of the molestation charges. The final grand jury disbanded in July without returning an indictment against Jackson.

The Chandlers stopped co-operating with the criminal investigation around July 6, 1994. Until that time, Jordan Chandler had indicated his possible willingness to testify according to prosecutors. The police never pressed criminal charges. Citing a lack of evidence without Jordan's testimony, the state closed its investigation on September 22, 1994. District attorney Sneddon and Lauren Weis, head of the county DA's Sex Crimes Unit, said that ending the investigation did not reflect any lack of faith in the alleged victims' credibility. The entire investigation involved two grand juries and more than 400 people interviewed over a period of 13 months.

Sneddon said several leads were explored which were later discovered to be false. According to the grand juries, the evidence presented by the Santa Barbara police and the LAPD was not convincing enough to indict Jackson or subpoena him, even though grand juries can indict the accused purely on hearsay evidence. According to a 1994 report by Variety, a source in contact with the grand juries said that none of the witnesses had produced anything to directly implicate Jackson. According to a 1994 report by Showbiz Today, the grand jurors claimed that "no damaging evidence was heard" and they "did not hear any damaging testimony" during the hearings.

In February 1994, the Santa Barbara County Grand Jury convened to assess whether criminal charges should be filed. The Los Angeles County Grand Jury began in March 1994. By 1994 prosecution departments in California had spent $2 million and convened two grand juries, but Jordan Chandler's allegations could not be corroborated. In September, Sneddon and Garcetti admitted the 18-month investigation had produced no evidence against Jackson. The FBI files on Michael Jackson, released after Jackson's death, also noted that the prosecution had no outstanding leads.

Aftermath
A week after the settlement in January 1994, L.A. District Attorney Garcetti announced that he supported amending a law that prohibited sexual assault victims from being compelled to testify in criminal proceedings. The amendment, introduced into the state assembly in February, would have immediately allowed Garcetti to compel Jordan Chandler's testimony.

On February 15, 1994, PBS Frontline aired the documentary Tabloid Truth: The Michael Jackson Story about the tabloid sensationalism, more preoccupied with selling papers than reporting an accurate narrative of the scandal. The documentary reported Jackson's housekeepers Mark and Faye Quindoy selling stories about Jackson for money, and bargaining for more money regarding child abuse allegations. They were depicted as untrustworthy. Phillip and Stella LeMarque, another pair of former employees to Jackson, sold a child abuse story to tabloids through pornographic film actor Paul Barresi, who once successfully sold a story to the National Enquirer. At the opportunity of the scandal, Barresi made a taped recording of alleged evidence and told the Globe that he intended to turn it over to the district attorney. The Globe and Barresi agreed on $15,000 for his story. Splash News journalist Kevin Smith said, "A lot of people who claimed to have witnessed Jackson doing this, that or the other—they weren't going to the police first. Their main interest was money, and they would come to journalists who could give them money. So in those circumstances, journalists know more about what happened than the police do."

Three years later, Victor M. Gutierrez self-published a book on the relationship between Jordan Chandler and Jackson. Gutierrez claimed that the book is based on a diary Jordan had kept at the time and included details of alleged sexual encounters with Jackson. According to German newspaper Die Tageszeitung, Gutierrez attended meetings of North American Man Boy Love Association (NAMBLA), a group advocating the decriminalization of pedophilia and pederasty, as a reporter in the 1980s. He said the group thought of Jackson as "one of us" and they insisted that the relationship between Jordan and Jackson was romantic.

In 1997, Jackson filed a civil suit against Gutierrez for slander after the writer claimed that he had a tape of Jackson molesting his nephew Jeremy, son of Jermaine Jackson. The jury ruled in Jackson's favor, awarding him $2.7 million. Gutierrez fled to Chile after the suit. Jackson's attorney Zia Modabber said, "Jurors told us that they not only wanted to compensate Mr. Jackson and punish Victor Gutierrez, but to send a message that they are tired of tabloids lying about celebrities for money." Jackson also filed a $100 million lawsuit against Diane Dimond after she appeared on KABC morning show Ken and Barkley to discuss Gutierrez's alleged tape. After the report was broadcast, Jackson announced he would sue members of the media who "spread vicious lies and rumors about me in their attempts to make money, benefit their careers, sell papers or get viewers to watch their programs." It was dismissed in 1997.

Jordan legally emancipated himself from his parents in 1994, at age 14. In 1996, Evan Chandler sued Jackson for around $60 million, claiming Jackson had breached an agreement never to discuss the case. In 1999, a court ruled in Jackson's favor and threw out the lawsuit. In 2006, Jordan accused his father of attacking him with a barbell, choking him and spraying his face with mace. The charges were dropped. On November 5, 2009, fourteen weeks after Jackson's death, Evan Chandler was found dead from suicide.

Effect on Jackson's career
Jackson's commercial standing and public image declined in the wake of the allegations. The government of Dubai forbade him from performing in response to an anonymous pamphlet campaign that attacked him as immoral. Jackson backed out of a deal to create a song and video for the film Addams Family Values, returning an estimated $5 million, and a brand of fragrances was canceled because of Jackson's drug problems. Jackson completed the video once planned for Addams Family Values and released it as Ghosts in 1996, with a framing story about an eccentric maestro who entertains children and is pursued by a bigoted local official. On November 14, 1993, PepsiCo dropped their nine-year partnership with Jackson, causing some fans to boycott the company. According to conflicting sources, Jackson agreed to compose music for the video game Sonic the Hedgehog 3, but left the project and was uncredited, possibly due to the allegations.

Jackson produced a special show for the premium cable network HBO, For One Night Only, to be recorded in front of a special invited audience at New York City's Beacon Theatre for broadcast in December 1995. The shows were canceled after Jackson collapsed at the theater on December 6 during rehearsals. Jackson was admitted overnight to Beth Israel Medical Center North. The shows were never rescheduled. The following year, Jackson began the HIStory World Tour. The only concerts in the USA were two shows at the Aloha Stadium in Honolulu, Hawaii.

Jackson's album HIStory, released shortly after the allegations, "creates an atmosphere of paranoia," according to critic Stephen Thomas Erlewine. Its content focuses on the public struggles Jackson went through prior to its production. In the songs "Scream", "Tabloid Junkie", and "You Are Not Alone", Jackson expresses his anger and hurt at the media. In the ballad "Stranger in Moscow", he laments his "swift and sudden fall from grace". In "D.S.", he attacks a character identified as Tom Sneddon, the District Attorney who requested his strip search. Jackson describes the person as a white supremacist who wanted to "get my ass, dead or alive". Sneddon said: "I have not, shall we say, done him the honor of listening to it, but I've been told that it ends with the sound of a gunshot."

According to The Washington Post, the O.J. Simpson trial overshadowed Jackson's scandal. A source from the Los Angeles District Attorney's Office said the scandal took "a back seat" once the Simpson case emerged. Scriptwriter Alison Taylor said that "O.J. Simpson is the best thing that ever happened to Michael Jackson". A judge observed in 2021 that "the fact that [Jackson] earned not a penny from his image and likeness in 2006, 2007, or 2008 shows the effect those allegations had, and continued to have, until his death".

Further allegations 

On December 18, 2003, Jackson was charged with seven counts of child sexual abuse and two counts of administering an intoxicating agent to commit a child sexual abuse felony against Gavin Arvizo. Jackson denied the allegations. Sneddon again led the prosecution.

The People v. Jackson trial began in Santa Maria, California, on January 31, 2005. The judge allowed testimony about past allegations, including the 1993 case, to establish whether the defendant had a propensity to commit certain crimes. However, Jordan Chandler left the country to avoid testifying. Mesereau later said: "The prosecutors tried to get [Chandler] to show up and he wouldn't. If he had, I had witnesses who were going to come in and say he told them it never happened and that he would never talk to his parents again for what they made him say."

June Chandler testified that she had not spoken to her son in 11 years. During her testimony, she claimed that she could not remember being counter-sued by Jackson and that she had never heard of her own attorney. She also said she never witnessed any molestation. Jackson was found not guilty of all 14 charges on June 13, 2005.

In 2013, Wade Robson, who testified in Jackson's defense, reversed his position and filed a lawsuit against Jackson's estate, saying Jackson had sexually abused him when Robson was aged between seven and 14. The allegations by Robson and another man, James Safechuck, are the focus of the 2019 documentary Leaving Neverland.

Notes

References

Works cited

 
 
 George, Nelson (2004). Michael Jackson: The Ultimate Collection booklet. Sony BMG.
 
 
 
 

Jackson, Michael
Michael Jackson
Criticism of journalism
1993 controversies in the United States
1993 in California
Crimes in California
Jackson, Michael